Isbel Cristina Parra Santos (born April 28, 1994) is a Venezuelan model, gymnast, fashion designer and beauty pageant titleholder who was crowned Miss Venezuela International 2020. She represented the Guayana Region at the Miss Venezuela 2020 pageant and will represent Venezuela at the Miss International 2022 competition who will be held in Yokohama, Japan.

Parra is a gymnastics coach for low-income girls and was for a long time a high-performance athlete, representing Venezuela in various international competitions.

Life and career

Early life and education
Parra was born and raised in Caracas, Venezuela. She comes from a family of athletes, has 4 brothers; her mother, Isabel Santos, was a high-level diver and now works as an international swimming judge, and her father, Humberto Parra, is a retired professional basketball player. Parra is a fashion designer, having graduated from the Brivil Institute of Environmental Design and Fashion in Caracas; characterized by promoting upcycling in her designs. In addition to this, she is a certified life coach.

Artistic gymnastics 
Isbel also began her career in the world of gymnastics at the age of 4, becoming part of the Venezuelan Gymnastics Team, an activity she maintained for more than 13 years; This earned her the opportunity to represent the country in various international competitions. Isbel would definitively retire from the championships at the age of 18, her last participation being the Gasparilla Classic, in Tampa, Florida, United States.

After that, she began to work as a coach and instructor of artistic gymnastics, especially towards low-income girls in her home city, thus founding the Génesis Gymnastic Club in Caracas. In the same way, she became a coach at the Dream Elite Gymnastics Club in Los Angeles, California.

Pageantry

Miss Earth Venezuela 2017
Parra began her participation in beauty pageants in 2012, managing to participate in the inaugural edition of Miss Earth Venezuela in 2017. Isbel represented the state of Trujillo in said contest.

Miss Venezuela 2020
Parra stands at 177 centimeters and competed as the first Miss Región Guayana, a debuting entity within Miss Venezuela's history. As one of 22 finalists in her country's national competition on Miss Venezuela 2020, she became one of the great favorites of said edition. At the end of Miss Venezuela 2020, held on September 24, 2020, Parra was crowned Miss International Venezuela 2020, succeeding outgoing Miss Venezuela International 2019, Melissa Jiménez of Zulia; being crowned by her the next day, due to the biosecurity measures implemented due to the COVID-19 pandemic. 

During her reign, Isbel was appointed by the Venezuelan Olympic Committee as the official ambassador of the Venezuelan delegation at the Tokyo 2020 Olympic Games. Another of the activities of her reign has been teaching basic Japanese calligraphy courses on social networks.

In August 2021, she became a guest host for Venevisión's morning magazine Portada's, as part of her preparation for the Miss International 2021 contest.

Miss International 2022 
As Miss Venezuela International, Parra had the right to represent Venezuela at the Miss International 2022 competition in Yokohama, Japan.

References 

1994 births
Living people
Venezuelan female models
Venezuelan beauty pageant winners
Miss International 2021 delegates
People from Caracas